The Ireland cricket team played the Afghanistan national cricket team in 2010 in Sri Lanka. Owing to the security situation in Afghanistan, they are unable to play home games in their own country, and so play home series in various locations in the Middle East and Indian subcontinent. The teams played an Intercontinental Cup match, and also played in a 4 team Twenty20 series.

Intercontinental Cup Match

Twenty20 Internationals
Afghanistan and Ireland participated in two Twenty20 tournaments during this period: 
A quadrangular Twenty20 tournament in Sri Lanka, together with Canada and Sri Lanka A. Ireland and Afghanistan played one game.
World Twenty20 Qualifier in the UAE, in which the two were drawn in the same group and played one game. The two also reached the final.

Quadrangular Series

World Twenty20 Qualifier

Afgh
2010 in cricket